Thirty is the third studio album by Australian recording artist Anthony Callea. It was released on 26 April 2013, by ABC Music.

Background
Thirty is Callea's first studio album signed with ABC Music. The album contains a collection of inspirational songs that embrace the artists and music that had influenced him over the years, as well as some original tracks. Thirty includes ten covers along with two originals, "My All" and "I'll Be the One".

Callea said of the album:

"A lot of these songs I've sung in a live environment, but I've never actually recorded. I wanted to have the opportunity to record them, call the album 'Thirty' and then put a couple of originals on it too. The new songs have been sitting in my iTunes folder for years and I've just been waiting for the right time to have them part of a body of work that I'm really proud of". Callea said that each song on this album has a special significance to him, "These are songs that mean something to me, whether it's melodically or the lyrics behind it or the artist singing it."

Promotion

Live performances
On 25 April 2013, Callea released a video for his song "My All" which features Tim Campbell. On 2 May 2013, Callea performed "My All" live on Sunrise.

Throughout May, Callea toured Westfield shopping centres in Knox, Liverpool, Castle Hill, Brisbane and Marion to promote the album.

Tour
The THIRTY Live in Concert tour saw Callea promote the album with a 7-date tour throughout July and August 2013 performing songs from Thirty to audiences across the East Coast, kicking off 13 July at The Palms at Melbourne's Crown Casino and continuing through NSW and QLD for seven dates in July and August.

Track listing

Charts

Release history

References

2013 albums
Anthony Callea albums